The Albania national under-20 football team, also known as Albania U20(s), is the national under-20 football team of Albania and is controlled by the Football Association of Albania. 

The under-20 squad is often cited as a feeder squad to the under-21 squad. Most of the player picked for this team are U-21 internationals already. 

Because there is no under-20 competition at UEFA level, Albania's under-20 side has generally only competed when it has qualified for the FIFA U-20 World Cup, which is held every 2 years. Qualification for this competition is achieved in view of performance at the preceding summer's UEFA European Under-19 Football Championship.

Albania have never played a game with the U-20 squad and the team was only formed after an invitation to play in 2009 Mediterranean Games in Pescara, Italy. Then Albania under-20 participated in the next tournament 2013 Mediterranean Games in Mersin, Turkey.

In 2017 the Albanian Football Association decided to "reborn" the under-20 side by assigning a Friendly match against Georgia under-20 side on 14 November 2017 at David Petriashvili Stadium in Tbilisi, Georgia.

History

2009 Mediterranean Games

Group D

Squad
The following players were called up and participated in the 2009 Mediterranean Games football tournament, which began on 25 June in Pescara, Italy.

COACH: Artan Bushati

2013 Mediterranean Games

Preliminary round - Group A

Classification stage - 5–8 matches

Classification stage - 7th place match

Players

Current squad
 The following players were called up for the friendly match.
 Match date: 12 June 2021
 Opposition:'''

Recent call-ups
The following players have been called up for Albania U20 squad within the past 12 months.

Notes
INJ Withdrew due to injury
PRE Preliminary squad / standby
RET Retired from international football
SUS Suspended from national team

Coaching staff
Current coaching staff:

Tournament history

FIFA U-20 World Cup

Mediterranean Games - Football

See also 
 Albania national football team
 Albania national under-23 football team
 Albania national under-21 football team
 Albania national under-19 football team
 Albania national under-18 football team
 Albania national under-17 football team
 Albania national under-16 football team
 Albania national under-15 football team
 Albania national football team results
 Albania national youth football team
 Albanian Superliga
 Football in Albania
 List of Albania international footballers

References

External links
 FIFA U-20 World Cup website
 Official FA Albania site

European national under-20 association football teams
under-20
Football in Albania